Grateful Dead Download Series Volume 12 is the twelfth in a series of live digital downloads of the band the Grateful Dead released by Grateful Dead Productions. It was released on April 4, 2006 and is a two disc release of a complete show the band performed on April 17, 1969 at Washington University in St. Louis. The second disc is also supplemented by two songs from a rehearsal at the Avalon Ballroom on January 23, 1969.

Volume 12 was mastered in HDCD by Jeffery Norman.

Track listing
Disc one
 "Hard To Handle" (Redding, Jones, Isbell) - 7:18
 "Morning Dew" (Dobson, Tim Rose) - 10:21
 "Good Morning Little Schoolgirl" (Sonny Boy Williamson) - 9:16
 "Dark Star" > (Jerry Garcia, Mickey Hart, Bill Kreutzmann, Phil Lesh, Ron "Pigpen" McKernan, Bob Weir, Robert Hunter) - 21:35
 "St. Stephen" > (Garcia, Lesh, Hunter) - 2:34
 "I Know It's A Sin" > (J. & M. Reed) - 3:45
 "St. Stephen" > (Garcia, Lesh, Hunter) - 3:01
 "Turn On Your Lovelight" (Malone, Scott) - 19:13
Disc two
"That's It for the Other One" > (Garcia, Kreutzmann, Weir) - 22:44
 "Caution (Do Not Stop On Tracks)" (Grateful Dead) - 1:53
 "The Eleven" (Lesh, Hunter) - 13:57
 "Dupree's Diamond Blues" (Garcia, Hunter) - 5:06
3 and 4 are bonus tracks from Avalon Ballroom, January 23, 1969 rehearsals.

Personnel
Grateful Dead
Tom Constanten - keyboards
Jerry Garcia - lead guitar, vocals
Mickey Hart - drums
Bill Kreutzmann - drums
Phil Lesh - electric bass
Ron "Pigpen" McKernan - percussion, harmonica, vocals
Bob Weir - rhythm guitar, vocals

Production
Owsley "Bear" Stanley - recording
Jeffrey Norman - mastering

References

12
2006 live albums